McIntosh Lake is a lake in the U.S. state of Washington.

McIntosh Lake takes its name from the adjacent community of McIntosh.

References

Lakes of Thurston County, Washington